Kedrovy is a town in Tomsk Oblast, Russia, situated in the valley of the Chusik River (Ob's basin). Population:  3,052 (2002 Census);

History
It was founded in 1982 and granted town status in 1987.

Administrative and municipal status
Within the framework of administrative divisions, it is, together with six rural localities, incorporated as Kedrovy Town Under Oblast Jurisdiction—an administrative unit with the status equal to that of the districts. As a municipal division, Kedrovy Town Under Oblast Jurisdiction is incorporated as Kedrovy Urban Okrug.

Transportation
There is an airport in the town.

References

Notes

Sources

External links

Official website of Kedrovy 
Kedrovy Business Directory 

Cities and towns in Tomsk Oblast
Populated places established in 1982
1982 establishments in Russia